A Place for Everything was a Canadian television nature series which aired on CBC Television from 1964 to 1966.

Premise
This series concerned ecology, covering topics such as endangered or lesser-known animal species. The series included a two-part feature on Arctic marine life while another explored some unpopulated Canadian islands.

Production
Toronto-based Dennis Spence produced the series, with Vancouver's Tom Connachie providing additional production work on three episodes. The musical score was provided by Ricky Hyslop. William W. H. Gunn, a biologist, provided scriptwriting and advice to the series and recorded nature sounds for the production. Soloists on the music track included John Dembeck, Nicolas Fiore, Alf Harris, Moe Koffman, Eugene Rittich and Eric Traugott.

Scheduling
The half-hour series aired on Fridays at 8 p.m. (Eastern) from 3 July to 18 September 1964. In 1966, it was rebroadcast Sundays at 5 p.m. from 30 January to 20 March.

References

External links
 

CBC Television original programming
1964 Canadian television series debuts
1966 Canadian television series endings
Black-and-white Canadian television shows
Nature educational television series